Steven Rice (born 1979) is an American composer, who has written works for a variety of ensembles including orchestra and choir.

Life and works
Rice studied music at the Eastman School of Music with Robert Morris and Carlos Sanchez-Gutierrez. His work for chamber ensemble Murmurs from Limbo won the 2005 Salvatore Martirano Memorial Composition Award, and he received a 2009 ASCAP Young Composer Award. Rice's orchestral work The Henry Ford Old Time Orchestra Plays Real American Tunes premiered in 2009 at the Cabrillo Festival of Contemporary Music.

List of works
 The Henry Ford Old Time Orchestra Plays Real American Tunes for Orchestra (2009)
 Murmurs from Limbo for Alto, Tenor, and Chamber Ensemble (2004)
 Evolution of Deniz (Dance) for Choral Ensemble (2009)

References

External links
Salvatore Martirano Memorial Composition Award
Composer's website

Living people
1979 births
20th-century classical composers
American male classical composers
American classical composers
Eastman School of Music alumni
20th-century American composers
20th-century American male musicians